Trichodes winkleri is a beetle species of checkered beetles belonging to the family Cleridae, subfamily Clerinae. It was described by Zirovnicky in 1976 and is endemic to Greece.

References

winkleri
Beetles described in 1976
Endemic fauna of Greece
Beetles of Europe